Bulatović is a Serbian surname.

Notable people with the name include:

Pavle Bulatović (1948-2000), Montenegrin and Yugoslav politician
Miodrag Bulatović (1930-1991), Serbian novelist
Momir Bulatović (born 1956), Montenegrin and Yugoslav politician
Predrag Bulatović, Montenegrin politician 
Anđela Bulatović, Montenegrin handball player
Katarina Bulatović, Serbian-born Montenegrin handball player
Rade Bulatović, former head of Serbia's intelligence agency, the Security Intelligence Agency

Serbian surnames
Montenegrin surnames